Réjean Houle (born October 25, 1949) is a Canadian former professional ice hockey forward who played the majority of his career with the Montreal Canadiens of the National Hockey League (NHL), also serving in a controversial stint as general manager for the Canadiens.

Playing career
Drafted as the first pick overall in the 1969 NHL Amateur Draft by the Montreal Canadiens, Houle played for the Habs from 1970 to 1973 and from 1976 to 1983. He won five Stanley Cup championships with the Canadiens. In between his NHL stints, he played for the Quebec Nordiques of the World Hockey Association (WHA).

Management career
After retiring as a player, Houle became an executive with Molson, one of Canada's leading breweries and the then-owner of the Montreal Canadiens organization. A disastrous start to the 1995–96 season resulted in then-general manager Serge Savard's termination, and the team saw Houle, with his business background and history with the team, as the most viable replacement candidate.

Houle then served as GM of the Canadiens from 1995 to 2000, though his tenure was largely viewed as a disaster by many fans. He initiated the infamous trade that sent Patrick Roy and Mike Keane to the Colorado Avalanche in exchange for Jocelyn Thibault, Martin Ručinský and Andrei Kovalenko just six weeks into the job. Following this trade, he dealt-away marquee players including Mark Recchi, Vincent Damphousse and Pierre Turgeon in exchange for players of little value to the team. He was also criticized for frequently trading with non-contending teams, being unable to land widely coveted free agents and for signing marginal players to inflated contracts.

Houle's drafting was considered even worse, however, as he was criticized for selecting players such as Matt Higgins, Jason Ward, Eric Chouinard and Marcel Hossa, the younger brother of then-rising talent Marián Hossa, with his first round selections, as well as trading away a top ten pick in the 1999 NHL Entry Draft for an underachieving Trevor Linden. Houle was fired from his post two months into the 2000–01 season and replaced by André Savard. He currently serves as an ambassador to the Canadiens organization.

Personal life
Houle and his wife Micheline have three children; two sons Jean-François, who is the head coach of the AHL's Laval Rocket and Sylvain, and a daughter, Annie.

Awards
1968–69: Eddie Powers Memorial Trophy

Career statistics

Regular season and playoffs

International

References

External links 
 Profile from Hockey Draft Central

1949 births
Living people
Canadian ice hockey forwards
French Quebecers
Sportspeople from Rouyn-Noranda
Montreal Canadiens draft picks
Montreal Canadiens executives
Montreal Canadiens players
Montreal Junior Canadiens players
National Hockey League first-overall draft picks
National Hockey League first-round draft picks
Quebec Nordiques (WHA) players
Stanley Cup champions
Ice hockey people from Quebec